Baden is an unincorporated community in Mason County, West Virginia, United States.

References 

Unincorporated communities in Mason County, West Virginia
Unincorporated communities in West Virginia